Joshua William Swartz (June 9, 1867 – May 27, 1959) was a Republican member of the U.S. House of Representatives from Pennsylvania.

Joshua W. Swartz was born in Lower Swatara Township, Dauphin County, Pennsylvania, just west of Harrisburg, Pennsylvania.  He was raised on his father's farm, and attended the rural schools, Lebanon Valley College, and Williamsport Commercial School.  He graduated from the law department of Dickinson College in Carlisle, Pennsylvania, in 1892.  He was admitted to the bar the same year and commenced practice in Harrisburg.  He was a member of the Pennsylvania State House of Representatives from 1915 to 1917.

Swartz was elected as a Republican to the Sixty-ninth Congress.  He declined to become a candidate for reelection in 1926, and resumed the practice of law until his death in Harrisburg.  He is buried in Paxtang Cemetery near Harrisburg.

Sources

The Political Graveyard

External links

 

Swartz, Joshua W.
Swartz, Joshua W.
Politicians from Harrisburg, Pennsylvania
Swartz, Joshua W.
Republican Party members of the United States House of Representatives from Pennsylvania